Peter Blecher (3 February 1934 – 27 August 2008) was a German sports shooter. He competed at the 1972 Summer Olympics and the 1984 Summer Olympics for West Germany.

References

1934 births
2008 deaths
German male sport shooters
Olympic shooters of West Germany
Shooters at the 1972 Summer Olympics
Shooters at the 1984 Summer Olympics
Sportspeople from Hagen